Kimberly J. Monaghan-Derrig is an American politician from Maine. Monaghan-Derrig, a Democrat from Cape Elizabeth, Maine, served in the Maine House of Representatives from August 2011, when she won a special election to finish the term begun by fellow Democrat Cynthia Dill. She served until December 2018, when she was term limited.

Prior to her election, Monaghan-Derrig was a member of the Cape Elizabeth School Board. She was born and raised in Cape Elizabeth.

References

Year of birth missing (living people)
Living people
People from Cape Elizabeth, Maine
Democratic Party members of the Maine House of Representatives
Women state legislators in Maine
School board members in Maine
University of Southern Maine alumni
21st-century American politicians
21st-century American women politicians